Jijeung of Silla (437–514) (r. 500–514) was the 22nd ruler of the Korean kingdom of Silla.  He is remembered for strengthening royal authority and building Silla into a centralized kingdom.

Like  many Silla kings, Jijeung was of royal blood on both sides.  His father was the Galmunwang Kim Seup-bo, who was a grandson of Naemul Isageum.  His mother was Lady Josaeng, the daughter of Nulji Isageum.

Jijeung began his program of legal reform in 502, when he outlawed the custom of burying servants with their masters.  In 503, he formally established the country's name as "Silla," it having previously been represented by a variety of Chinese characters.  At the same time, he took the title of wang, meaning "king"; he had previously borne the native Silla title of maripgan.

Jijeung continued this program in the following years, with a reform of ceremonial dress in 504 and of local administration in 505.  In that reform, he incorporated the old territory of Siljik-guk into the Silla administrative system.  He established a market in eastern Gyeongju in 509.  In 512, he sent Kim Isabu to conquer the island nation of Usan-guk.

After his death, Jijeung received a temple name, the name by which he is now known.  He was the first Silla king to receive a temple name.

Family
Father:  Galmunwang Seupbo
Mother: Lady Kim
Wife: Queen Yeonje of the Park Clan (연제부인박씨)
Son: Beopheung of Silla (r. 514–540 AD) - the 23rd monarch of Silla
Son: Galmunwang Ipjong
 Grandson: Jinheung of Silla - the 24th monarch of Silla
Son: Kim Ajinjong (김아진종)

See also
 Unified Silla
 List of Korean monarchs
 List of Silla people

References

Silla rulers
514 deaths
6th-century monarchs in Asia
437 births
6th-century Korean people
5th-century Korean people